The C.R. Thomson House and Barn are historic buildings at 795 Chockalog Street in Uxbridge, Massachusetts.  The house is a modest  story timber-frame cottage estimated to have been built around 1800.  It is predominantly vernacular in its styling, except for a c. 1870s Victorian entry.  The barn on the property also dates to the 1870s, and has some elaborate Gothic styling, including bracketed cornices, and bargeboard decoration around its entrances.  The property was associated at that time with Comford R. Thomson, a breeder of show cattle.

On October 7, 1983, they were added to the National Register of Historic Places.

See also
National Register of Historic Places listings in Uxbridge, Massachusetts

References

Houses in Uxbridge, Massachusetts
Barns in Massachusetts
National Register of Historic Places in Uxbridge, Massachusetts
Houses on the National Register of Historic Places in Worcester County, Massachusetts
Barns on the National Register of Historic Places in Massachusetts